Kim Kap-Hwan (Kimu Kaffan, sometimes written as  (Kim Kap-hwan)), usually written as Kim Kaphwan, is a fictional character in both the Fatal Fury and The King of Fighters series created by SNK. He is credited as the first ever fictional Korean character to appear in a fighting game. Kim is first introduced in Fatal Fury 2 as a playable character. In the series, Kim is a master of taekwondo and also considers himself a fighter for justice. Since Kim was young and during his taekwondo training sessions, he was always reminded to fight for justice and use the martial art as a way to accomplish this. He is also a regular character from The King of Fighters, in which he is the leader of the Korea Team and spends time trying to rehabilitate his two team mates, Chang Koehan and Choi Bounge, out from their criminal lives. He also appears in the Fatal Fury animated films and comics adaptations from the video games.

Although appearing in every mainline entry of The King of Fighters franchise (one of only eight characters to do so), Kim was actually a last-minute entry in the franchise's first game and he was passed over for the first KOF: Maximum Impact game due to complaints from designers. However, Kim's character has been well received by gamers, who commonly vote for him in popularity polls developed by video games journals and websites. He has also received comments from video games publications, which praised his development in the SNK games, but criticized his absence in KOF: Maximum Impact.

Conception and creation
Kim was originally named "Haifon Kim" but that idea was later dropped because it was not a valid Korean name. After a talk with Kim Kap-hwan, the president of the Korean company Viccom, the SNK staff decided to rename the character Kim Kaphwan.

Kim's addition to The King of Fighters series was considered to be forced; the game was meant to have a Fugitive Team composed of Chang Koehan and Choi Bounge and an unknown criminal. But due to certain circumstances, Kim was the one who had Choi and Chang as his teammates as the leader of the Korea Team. Originally, Kim was going to enter the first entry of the Maximum Impact series under the pseudonym "Mr. Taekwondo" -in the same fashion as Art of Fighting's Mr. Karate. Due to veteran designers' complaints and other difficulties at the time, it was finally decided to leave Kim out of the game's lineup but add another character like him to replace his absence. While several other characters were considered for the spot -including other SNK characters such as Jhun Hoon, May Lee and Buriki One character Seo Yong Song - a fellow developer voiced interest in creating another female Taekwondo fighter with the same "professional" manner as Kim, which eventually formed the basis for Chae Lim.

Personality
One of Kim's defining characteristics is his strong, inherent sense of justice. It is to the point where he has the innate ability to tell whether or not someone is evil or holds dark intentions just by looking at that person. As such, whenever Kim fights against an evil character (e.g. Geese Howard, Rugal Bernstein etc.), Kim has a special opening pose, in which, he glares menacingly at the evil opponent, and he slowly raises his hand and points at the opponent, saying "Aku wa yurusan!" (Japanese for "Evil is unforgivable!") "Hah!" and jumps into his fighting stance (except for The King of Fighters 2003 and XI).

Kim strives for excellence and righteousness in everything he does, be it his fighting or personal life. He is deeply respected and admired by his acquaintances for his honesty and bravery and has many friends amongst the characters in both King of Fighters and Fatal Fury. Conversely, the Fatal Fury Team ending in King of Fighters XI shows that Kim might be quite an annoyance at times as well; in this case, he spends the whole time talking about justice and its power. Kim also has two sons, Kim Dong Hwan and Kim Jae Hoon, as well as a wife (named Myeng Swuk in Fatal Fury: The Motion Picture), as well as many others in his dojang.

Appearances

In video games
Kim first appears in Fatal Fury 2 as a playable character. He travels to Southtown to fight Wolfgang Krauser, who was looking for some decent challenges in the King of Fighters fighting tournament. On the way, he encounters the former King of Fighters champion Terry Bogard. They soon become good friends, and ever since, Kim always agrees to help Terry in all that he can, though a definite rivalry is maintained. He also appears in all the Real Bout games from the series. He is also present in Fatal Fury: Wild Ambition, a 3D game which retells the story from the first Fatal Fury game but with characters from the sequels including Kim. He makes a cameo appearance in Garou: Mark of the Wolves in one of his son's (Dong Hwan) win poses.

In The King of Fighters, Kim is considered as both a sport and national hero in his native Korea. This status is what enabled him to convince the authorities to give him custody over Chang Koehan and Choi Bounge to rehabilitate them out of their criminal ways. Although both men resent Kim for his actions, they later grow up to grudgingly respect him. Due to the increase of required members in The King of Fighters '99, Kim's rival, Jhun Hoon, joins the Korea Team. However, in The King of Fighters 2001, Jhun has an accident and he is replaced by Kim's student, May Lee. By The King of Fighters 2003, the requirements of members return to three and this time the members of the Korea Team are Kim, Jhun and Chang. In The King of Fighters XI, Kim appears as a member of the Fatal Fury Team along with Terry Bogard and Duck King as the team needed one more member. In The King of Fighters XII, Kim is a playable character, but like each of them, he does not have a team. As The King of Fighters XIII has returned to assigning the characters into official teams, Kim is cast as the leader of his team, composing of himself, Raiden and Hwa Jai (both from Fatal Fury: King of Fighters). He is teamed with the men because, after "rehabilitating" Chang and Choi, he seeks out Raiden and Hwa Jai believing they are still working for Geese (they are not but they pretend that they still do so they can compete in The King of Fighters tournament). The games from the series which do not contain plot, The King of Fighters '98 and The King of Fighters 2002, also feature Kim along with Choi and Chang in the Korea Team. In the console version of The King of Fighters Neowave, Kim appears as a hidden character without an official team.

In the spin-off game, The King of Fighters Kyo, Kim is not playable but he can be aided by the lead character Kyo Kusanagi in order to train Chang and Choi. In the two games for the Game Boy Advance titled EX: Neo Blood and EX2, the Korea Team is featured in its original form. Kim does not appear in KOF: Maximum Impact as he was replaced with his pupil Chae Lim. However, he is a hidden character in KOF: Maximum Impact 2 and also makes a cameo in Chae Lim's ending. He also appears in the crossovers Neo Geo Battle Coliseum and the SNK vs. Capcom series as a playable character. In Super Smash Bros. Ultimate, he appears both as a background character in the King of Fighters Stadium stage and as a spirit.

In other media
Kim also appears in two of the three animated films from Fatal Fury in which he takes supporting roles. He is voiced by Daiki Nakamura in the Japanese versions and by David Kaye in the English dub. In Fatal Fury 2: The New Battle, Kim challenges Terry to fight after learning that he defeated the former crime lord from Southtown Geese Howard to test his own strength. Although he is defeated, he and Terry become good friends. In the sequel, Fatal Fury: The Motion Picture, he also appears reuniting with Terry and his friends along with his family searching to have a rematch with Terry. However, during the meeting Cheng Sinzan (from Fatal Fury 2), enhanced by cyber-armor attacks all the people and Kim is seriously injured. Despite his wounds, Kim manages to defeat Cheng, but spends most of the time of the film recovering. He also stars in manhua from the video games which retell his actions from the games.

Reception
Gamers have well-received Kim's character, appearing in various polls developed by journals and websites. In Gamests 1997 Heroes Collection, Kim was voted as the staff's tenth favorite character. In a 2005 poll made by SNK-Playmore USA, he was voted as the tenth fan favorite character with a total of 119 votes. Gamest magazine  ranked Kim at No. 44 in Top 50 Characters of 1994 (sharing the spot with three other characters).

Kim has received comments from video games reviewers, who added praise and criticism to his character. Kurt Kalata from Armchairempire.com commented on Kim's introduction in the series to be a big improvement for the series, praising him to later become a regular character in The King of Fighters. In another review, Simon Wigham from Console Obsession agreed on this, also noting that Kim later became a legend from The King of Fighters. Kim was also commented to be a favourite absent in KOF: Maximum Impact by Chris Wigham from the same site. On the other hand, Wigham then added that his replacement, Chae Lim, is basically a clone from Kim as they have the same moves. GameSpot reviewer Greg Kasavin liked the addition of Kim to KOF: Maximum Impact 2 as he noted that his 3D design was not just a rehash and instead a completely different. Kasavin also listed his "Phoenix Kick" move, first introduced in Fatal Fury 2, as the sixth best move in a fighting game, labeling it as one of "the coolest-looking moves in any fighting game" which helped to popularize SNK's games. Kim's appearance in The King of Fighters XII was criticized for lacking several of his recurring special moves. IGN writer Anthony Chau liked the found Kim's son as his favourite characters from Garou: Mark of the Wolves due to how similar their fighting styles are to Kim's as well as their relation. Den of Geek listed him as the second best King of Fighters character, praising his personality and legacy across the franchise. The same site also listed him as the sixth best character from the KOF, complimenting him as a good hero based on his traits.

NotesI''': His name is written in Korean as 김갑환 (RR: Gim Gap-hwan, M-R: Kim Kap-hwan''). For more information, see Korean name and Kim (Korean surname).

References

External links

Fatal Fury 15th Anniversary Official Website 
The King of Fighters 10th Anniversary Official Website

Fatal Fury characters
Fictional South Korean people in video games
Fictional male martial artists
Fictional martial artists in video games
Fictional taekwondo practitioners
Male characters in video games
SNK protagonists
The King of Fighters characters
Video game characters introduced in 1992
Video game characters with superhuman strength